Chime Communications can be:
Chime Communications Limited, a public relations and advertising group based in London, United Kingdom
Chime Communications (Australia), a telecommunications company in Australia